The Night Porter is a 1930 British comedy film directed by Sewell Collins and starring Donald Calthrop, Trilby Clark and Gerald Rawlinson. The film was made by Gaumont British Picture Corporation, an affiliate of Gainsborough Pictures, at the Lime Grove Studios with sets designed by Andrew Mazzei. It was produced as a quota quickie for release as a second feature. It was based on a popular music hall sketch by Fred Rome and Harry Wall depicting a honeymooning couple and the hotel night porter they encounter.

Cast
 Donald Calthrop as The Porter  
 Trilby Clark as The Wife  
 Gerald Rawlinson as The Husband  
 Barbara Gott 
 Tom Shale
 Anna Ludmilla

References

Bibliography
 Chibnall, Steve. Quota Quickies: The Birth of the British 'B' Film. British Film Institute, 2007.
Wood, Linda. British Films, 1927–1939. British Film Institute, 1986.

External links

1930 films
1930 comedy films
British comedy films
Films set in England
Gainsborough Pictures films
Films shot at Lime Grove Studios
Films directed by Sewell Collins
British black-and-white films
Quota quickies
1930s English-language films
1930s British films